DECA Games is a game publisher and developer of video games that is headquartered in Berlin, Germany. The company's primary focus is on acquiring and operating older free-to-play games as a service. They are the current owners and developers of the massively multiplayer online shooter Realm of the Mad God. The company has also acquired a number of free-to-play mobile games, including DragonVale and multiple titles from Japanese publisher GREE (including Crime City, Knights and Dragons, Modern War and Kingdom Age).

In August 2020, the company was acquired by Embracer Group, which made it as the sixth major operative group in the company to focus on free-to-play mobile games.

Acquisitions 
DECA Games acquired mobile games Crime City, Kingdom Age, Knights and Dragons, and Modern War from Japanese publisher GREE on October 17, 2019.

DECA Games acquired DragonVale from Backflip Studios, which closed at the end of 2019, on March 17, 2020.

References

2020 mergers and acquisitions
Companies based in Berlin
Embracer Group
German companies established in 2016
Video game companies established in 2016
Video game companies of Germany
Video game development companies
Video game publishers